Eosin Y, also called C.I. 45380 or C.I. Acid Red 87, is a member of the triarylmethane dyes. It is produced from fluorescein by bromination.

Use
Eosin Y is commonly used as the red dye in red inks.

It is commonly used in histology, most notably in the H&E (Haematoxylin and Eosin) stain. Eosin Y is also widely used in the Papanicolaou stain (or Pap stain used in the Pap test) and the Romanowsky type cytologic stains. It is also used as a photosensitizer in organic synthesis.

See also
Eosin

References

Staining
Bromoarenes
Fluorone dyes
Benzoic acids
Triarylmethane dyes